The Rhode Island House of Representatives is the lower house of the Rhode Island General Assembly, the state legislature of the U.S. state of Rhode Island, the upper house being the Rhode Island Senate. It is composed of 75 members, elected to two-year terms from 75 districts of equal population. The Rhode Island General Assembly does not have term limits. The House meets at the Rhode Island State Capitol in Providence.

House leadership

The Speaker of the House presides over the House of Representatives. The Speaker is elected by the majority party caucus followed by confirmation of the full House through the passage of a House Resolution. As well as presiding over the body, the Speaker is also the chief leadership position, and controls the flow of legislation. Other House leaders, such as the majority and minority leaders, are elected by their respective party caucuses relative to their party's strength in the chamber.

Officers

Committee leadership

All chairs and vice chairs are members of the Democratic Party.

Composition

Members of the Rhode Island House of Representatives
This list is of members elected in November 2020, to serve in the 2021–22 biennium.

Past composition of the House of Representatives

See also
Rhode Island State House
Rhode Island General Assembly
Rhode Island Senate

References

External links
Rhode Island House of Representatives official government website
Map of Rhode Island State House Districts
State House of Rhode Island at Project Vote Smart

Rhode Island General Assembly
State lower houses in the United States